The Electoral district of Wantirna was an electoral district of the Victorian Legislative Assembly. It was first created after the Electoral district of Scoresby was abolished in 1976. Geoff Hayes was the last member for Scoresby in its first incarnation, and the first for Wantirna. After the 2002 redistribution, the electorate was replaced, once again returning as the Electoral district of Scoresby. The last member of Wantirna, Kim Wells was also the first member for Scoresby, in its second incarnation.

Members for Wantirna

Election results

See also
 Parliaments of the Australian states and territories
 List of members of the Victorian Legislative Assembly

References

Former electoral districts of Victoria (Australia)
1976 establishments in Australia
2002 disestablishments in Australia